Hoop and Holler is an unincorporated community in Liberty County, Texas, United States.

It has frequently been noted on lists of unusual place names.

References

Unincorporated communities in Liberty County, Texas
Unincorporated communities in Texas